Balireddy Satya Rao was an Indian politician belonging to YSR Congress Party. He was a minister of Andhra Pradesh Government and legislator of the Andhra Pradesh Legislative Assembly.

Biography
Satya Rao was elected as a legislator of the Andhra Pradesh Legislative Assembly from Chodavaram as an Indian National Congress candidate in 1989. He served as Minor Irrigation Minister of Andhra Pradesh from 1992 to 1994. He was elected again from Chodavaram in 1999. He joined YSR Congress Party in 2013.

Satya Rao died in a road accident on 27 September 2019.

References

2019 deaths
Members of the Andhra Pradesh Legislative Assembly
YSR Congress Party politicians
1930s births
Indian National Congress politicians from Andhra Pradesh